Hugh Vincent Clarke (27 November 1919 – 29 November 1996) was an Australian soldier, public servant and author, specialising in military history.

Born in Brisbane, Queensland, on 27 November 1919, Clarke was a cadet surveyor with the Queensland Main Roads Commission. He left the Commission to enlist in the 2/10th Field Regiment, 8th Division in July 1940. He served as a bombardier in Malaya and in Singapore before being taken prisoner by the Japanese after the fall of Singapore in February 1942. He was imprisoned in Changi Prison and also forced to work on the infamous Thai-Burma Railway.

After the war, Clarke joined the Commonwealth Public Service and became Director of Information and Public Relations for the Department of External Affairs in Canberra. He retired because of ill health in 1976. He was married with five children.

Bibliography

References

1919 births
1996 deaths
20th-century Australian novelists
20th-century Australian male writers
Australian Army soldiers
Australian male novelists
Australian Army personnel of World War II
20th-century Australian non-fiction writers
Australian prisoners of war
Australian public servants
Australian male short story writers
People from Brisbane
World War II prisoners of war held by Japan
Burma Railway prisoners